The Lakes College (also known as TLC) is an independent Uniting Church co-educational primary and secondary day school located in the suburb of North Lakes in the Moreton Bay Region, Queensland, Australia.

History
The Lakes College opened in 2005 and caters for approximately 700 students from Prep to Year 12. The College was originally a joint initiative of the Anglican Church of Australia and the Uniting Church. Until 2008, it was operated by EDUCANG Limited along with Forest Lake College, Mary McConnel School, The FLC International Centre, and The Springfield College. In 2008, sole ownership of The Lakes College was assumed by the Uniting Church.

The Lakes College's curriculum includes individualised training in the academic, cultural, social, spiritual and physical domains.

See also 

 List of schools in Queensland
 List of United Church schools in Australia

References 
A Student of TLC

External links
The Lakes College website

Private primary schools in Brisbane
Private secondary schools in Brisbane
Uniting Church schools in Australia
Defunct Anglican schools in Australia
Shire of Pine Rivers
Educational institutions established in 2005
Schools in South East Queensland
North Lakes, Queensland
2005 establishments in Australia
Buildings and structures in Moreton Bay Region